Dato' Sri Idris Jala (born 21 August 1958) is a Malaysian technocrat. He served as the Minister in the Prime Minister's Department and as the chief executive officer of the Performance Management and Delivery Unit (Pemandu) from 2009 till 2015, the unit tasked with spearheading Malaysia's transition towards high income status by 2020. He was also a Senator in the Dewan Negara from 2009 till 2015. At present, he is the President and CEO of PEMANDU Associates, a global consultancy firm focused on public sector transformation and business turnaround.

Background and career
Idris is a transformation guru in turning around companies' performance through his BIG FAST RESULTS methodology and transformational strategies that are innovate, rigorous and relevant to today's demands. He has continuously delivered sustainable socio economic reforms which, in 2014, saw Bloomberg place him among the top 10 most influential policy makers in the world.

Idris is also the Founder and Executive Chairman of The Global Transformation Forum (GTF), the world's singular platform for influential, global leaders to engage and share experiences and best practices on how to drive transformation.

Prior to his Government stint, Idris used to work for Shell. In 2005, the Malaysian government elected him as CEO of Malaysia Airlines due to massive losses of the company. In February 2006, he announced the airline's business turnaround plan from a 9-month loss of US$400 million in 2005 to achieving a record profit of US$260 million in 2007. He served until August 2009 after successfully turning around MAS and was awarded the CAPA Airline Turnaround of the Year (2006). He was also voted as a Governor on the Board of IATA (International Air Transport Association) in 2006.

Before MAS, he spent 23 years at Shell, rising up the ranks to hold senior positions including Vice President, Shell Retail International and Vice President Business Development Consultancy, based in UK. He was appointed as the CEO of Shell Middle Distillates (SMDS) Bintulu and Shell Sri Lanka. Both companies saw successful business turnarounds under his leadership.

Idris Jala is a Kelabit from Sarawak and is a Christian. He is one of the few non-Malay non-Muslims to have been appointed to head a GLC.

Cabinet minister
As of September 2009, Idris was sworn in as Minister in the Prime Minister's Department. Idris was appointed Minister without Portfolio in the Prime Minister's Department and chief executive officer of the Performance Management and Delivery Unit (Pemandu). As CEO of Pemandu, the unit monitoring the implementation of the Key Performance Indicator (KPI) initiative, he will assist and report to Tan Sri Dr. Koh Tsu Koon, the Minister in the Prime Minister's Department who is responsible for national unity and performance management.

Honours

Honours of Malaysia
  :
  Commander of the Order of Meritorious Service (PJN) – Datuk (2007)
  :
 Grand Knight of the Order of Sultan Ahmad Shah of Pahang (SSAP) – Dato' Sri (2007)
  :
  Commander of the Order of the Star of Hornbill Sarawak (PGBK) – Datuk (2007)

References 

1958 births
Living people
People from Sarawak
Kelabit people
Malaysian Christians
Malaysian businesspeople
Malaysian bankers
Malaysian chairpersons of corporations
Malaysian chief executives
Sarawak politicians
Government ministers of Malaysia
Members of the Dewan Negara
Alumni of the University of Warwick
Commanders of the Order of Meritorious Service
Commanders of the Order of the Star of Hornbill Sarawak
21st-century Malaysian businesspeople
21st-century Malaysian politicians